The 2022 St. Patrick's Day Slam was the second annual St. Patrick's Day Slam  professional wrestling television special produced by All Elite Wrestling (AEW). The event took place on March 16, 2022, at the Freeman Coliseum in San Antonio, Texas. It was broadcast on TBS as a special episode of AEW's weekly television program, Wednesday Night Dynamite.

Production

Storylines
St. Patrick's Day Slam featured professional wrestling matches that involved different wrestlers from pre-existing scripted feuds and storylines. Wrestlers portrayed heroes, villains, or less distinguishable characters in scripted events that built tension and culminated in a wrestling match or series of matches. Storylines were produced on AEW's weekly television program, Dynamite, the supplementary online streaming shows, Dark and Elevation, and The Young Bucks' YouTube series Being The Elite.

Background
For the second year in a row Thunder Rosa and Dr. Britt Baker, D.M.D. main evented St. Patrick's Day Slam, they faced off in a Steel Cage match where Rosa defeated Baker to become the new AEW Women's World Champion.

Adam Cole and reDRagon teamed up against the team of 'Hangman' Adam Page and Jurassic Express (Jungle Boy and Luchasaurus) in a trios match.

Scorpio Sky defended his TNT Championship against Wardlow and The Hardys (Matt and Jeff) made their AEW debut as a tag team facing off against Private Party (Isiah Kassidy and Marq Quen).

Results

See also
2022 in professional wrestling

References

External links
All Elite Wrestling Official website

2022 American television episodes
All Elite Wrestling shows
Events in San Antonio
March 2022 events in the United States
Professional wrestling in Texas
Professional wrestling in San Antonio
2022 in professional wrestling
Holidays themed professional wrestling events